The De Gasperi I Cabinet was the last cabinet of the Kingdom of Italy, which was abolished with the referendum of 2 June 1946, in which the Italian people voted in favour of the Republic. It held office from 10 December 1945 until 13 July 1946, a total of 216 days, or 7 months and 4 days.

Government parties
The government was composed by the following parties:

Composition

References

Italian governments
1945 establishments in Italy
1946 disestablishments in Italy
Cabinets established in 1945
Cabinets disestablished in 1946
De Gasperi 1 Cabinet